Psilocurus  is a genus of robber flies in the family of Asilidae. There are about 14 described species in Psilocurus.

Species
These 14 species belong to the genus Psilocurus:

 Psilocurus birdi Curran, 1931
 Psilocurus blascoi Weinberg & Bachli, 2001
 Psilocurus camposi Curran, 1931
 Psilocurus caudatus Williston, 1901
 Psilocurus hypopygialis (Paramonov, 1930)
 Psilocurus modestus (Williston, 1893)
 Psilocurus negrus Lehr, 1974
 Psilocurus nudiusculus Loew, 1874
 Psilocurus pallustris Hull, 1961
 Psilocurus puellus Bromley, 1934
 Psilocurus pygmaeus Hull, 1961
 Psilocurus reinhardi Bromley, 1951
 Psilocurus tibialis Hull, 1961
 † Paraclia tarsalis (Statz, 1940)

References

Further reading

 
 
 

Laphriinae
Articles created by Qbugbot